HMS Mullett was a Royal Navy Ballahoo-class schooner of four 12-pounder carronades and a crew of 20. The prime contractor for the vessel was Goodrich & Co., in Bermuda, and she was launched in 1807. Mullett had an apparently useful and completely uneventful career until she was sold at the end of 1814.

Service
She was commissioned under Lieutenant Martin Guise for Halifax and the West Indies. In 1808 Lieutenant Abraham Brown assumed command. On 22 February 1808 she captured the American ship Thames. At the same time she also detained the American brig Columbia, which resulted in the incurring of some expenses that were deducted from the prize money.

Mullett shadowed them for three hours. At the time it was believed that they were the vessels that had left Rochefort on 17 January.

In 1809 Lieutenant Robert Standly replaced Brown. In May 1810 she was in home waters under Lieutenant John Geary. Between September and October she was under repair at Plymouth. Between 9 and 11 November Geary faced a court martial. The charges were that he had not done his utmost to execute the orders of Sir Robert Calder in proceeding with the mails for Surinam, Berbice and Demerara. Instead, he had twice returned to port. He argued in his defence that his crew had been too sickly for him to proceed. The court's sentence was that he be severely reprimanded.

In 1811 she was under Lieutenant Hugh Andersen in the Channel, and then in the next year under Lieutenant Thomas Evans surveying the Irish Sea. In 1813 she was under Lieutenant John Neale and then in 1814 under Lieutenant Josiah Thompson, who sailed her on the North Coast of Spain.

Fate
She was sold at Plymouth for £390 on 15 December 1814.

Post script
In January 1819, the London Gazette reported that Parliament had voted a grant to all those who had served under the command of Lord Viscount Keith in 1812, between 1812 and 1814, and in the Gironde. Mullet was listed among the vessels that had served under Keith in 1813 and 1814.

Notes

Citations

References
 

 

1807 ships
Ballahoo-class schooners
Ships built in Bermuda